Hewish is a surname. Notable people with the surname include:

Antony Hewish (1924–2021), English astronomer
James Hewish, Australian short track speed skating referee

See also
East Hewish and West Hewish, hamlets in the civil parish of Puxton, England